The Special Operations Forces (abbreviated ) are the special forces of Ukraine and one of the five branches of the Armed Forces of Ukraine, with headquarters in Kyiv.

The SSO has the roles including various special forces-related duties such as direct action, special reconnaissance, intelligence gathering, sabotage and psychological warfare. They are not the only special forces units in Ukraine. The SSO was created in 2016, after various reforms of the Ukrainian Armed Forces due to failures in the war in Donbas, and the Ukrainian special forces groups were trained on the model of NATO reaction forces. Reorganizing by concentrating the special forces command into a single unified branch. Previously, military Spetsnaz were under the command of the Chief Directorate of Intelligence (HUR), Ukraine's military intelligence service.

History
The branch was formed based on military units of the Ukrainian Chief Directorate of Intelligence (HUR), the military intelligence service, which were originally formed of the Soviet GRU Spetsnaz, based in Ukraine (then Ukrainian SSR). They were special forces units under the command of the Soviet military intelligence service GRU; the Ukrainians adopted a similar model, placing their top special forces unit under the HUR.

In 2014, Special Forces Command numbered over 4,000 spetsnaz operatives, all of whom are professional soldiers.

War in Donbas

At the beginning of the Crimea Crisis and the war in Donbas Ukraine's parliament stated that their forces only had 6,000 combat ready infantrymen, this compared with approximately 20,000 troops stationed at Russian bases in Crimea alone. At the time Ukraine also had a sizable number of units deployed across the world as part of missions such as Operation Atalanta, ISAF, Kosovo Force, and over 200 troops attached to a UN peacekeeping mission in the Congo.

This meant that Ukraine's most experienced and well trained troops were deployed and unavailable at the start of the conflict. Ukrainian government immediately began a process of mobilization and the creation of reserve forces such as the National Guard of Ukraine, however it would be several months until these units would be trained. Therefore, Ukraine's depleted Spetsnaz forces, without the aid of a larger conventional force, or an effective local police force, were called to defend the state. According to Ukraine's Minister of Defense Stepan Poltorak, Spetsnaz forces operated largely alone during the first period of the war in Ukraine's Donbas region as they were the only units fit for duty at the time.

A group of heavily armed men appeared in Donetsk on 3 March 2014. These were mistakenly identified at first as Russian Spetsnaz operatives invading Ukraine by some, or American "Blackwater" mercenaries by others. However, it was revealed that it was actually members of Ukraine's Alpha Group escorting Andrey Shishatskiy, the ex-governor of Donetsk, after he was attacked by a group of pro-Russian separatists or Russian Spetsnaz. Several months later Mariupol was declared the administrative center of Donetsk oblasts due to unrest, and most administrative functions were transferred there.

Despite having lost many members, Ukrainian Spetsnaz was called to service in April 2014 once Russian insurgents began to advance into Ukraine. One of the first large scale missions was to retake the Kramatorsk airfield as a pivot point to put pressure on Donetsk, which had largely been taken over by insurgents. On 15 April, Spetsnaz unit Omega stormed the airfield retaking it and capturing an undisclosed number of pro-Russian insurgents in the process. Kramatorsk airfield was the scene of prolonged fighting even after its recapture. On 25 April insurgents launched a failed attempt to retake the airfield destroying a Mil Mi-8 helicopter and an An-2 transport. The airfield was surrounded by insurgents for several months until the liberation of Kramatorsk from insurgents in July 2014.

On April 25, 2014, Ukraine's Spetsnaz units were some of the first units to encounter insurgents in Sloviansk, which was to become a rebel stronghold. Ukrainian Spetsnaz units began to systematically destroy rebel checkpoints around the city in April so that regular forces could break through into the city, however it would be several more months until the main components of the Ground Forces of Ukraine were able to break through into the city.

On 26 May 2014 Russian insurgents launched an attack taking Donetsk Airport, the nation's second busiest airport at the time. For the first time in the conflict Ukrainian forces responded almost immediately instead of waiting several days by launching airstrikes from Su-25 aircraft and launching Mi-24 gunships to suppress the attackers. Spetsnaz forces as well as airborne troops were airlifted to the scene to battle the insurgents for the airport starting the First Battle of Donetsk Airport. With the help of air support government forces drove out insurgents by the next day and took control of the airport. This was the first successful operation in the war in Donbas, as prior to this insurgent forces were accustomed to quick victories and government forces typically took several days to respond to attacks. After the battle many foreigners including Chechen terrorists were revealed to have fought against Ukrainian forces.
In May and June 2014 Special Forces units were involved in aiding regular army and National Guard Units in the First Battle of Mariupol. By this time Russian separatists had captured most of Donetsk Oblast as far north as Yampil', although government troops retained control of key points such as Kramatorsk and Donetsk airfields. Insurgents then spread south toward Mariupol, the second largest city in the Donbas.  On April 17, 2014, a large group of several hundred separatists attempted to storm a military base in Mariupol.

The Ukrainian military counterattacked and an Omega special forces unit was air lifted unto the scene to help local troops drive back the attackers. During the failed assault 63 separatists were captured and three killed. The Omega special forces group was then tasked with protecting Mariupol for the remainder of the First Battle of Mariupol.

On 9 May separatists stormed the city police headquarters. Omega and National Guard Units attempted to recapture the building but Ukrainian forces eventually retreated outside the city and cordoned off the city limits with check points. On 13 June Omega special forces, along with National Guard units, Azov Battalion and Dnipro Battalion stormed the city. In the ensuing 6 hour battle government troops recaptured all buildings from separatists and hoisted the Ukrainian flag over the city hall.

Ukraine's special forces have also carried out several operations deep into rebel held territory, operating in the cities of Donetsk and Luhansk.

Spetsnaz forces have also been responsible for locating and neutralizing terrorist cells operating deep inside of Ukraine, clearing cities that had been recaptured from insurgents, as well as searching for potential saboteurs. In May, the SBU raided and arrested several potential saboteurs in the Odessa region.

The Ukrainian Naval Infantry maintains its own small Spetsnaz force in the form of the 73rd marine Spetsnaz detachment. The detachment is named "Seals" after the United States Navy SEALs and is tasked around the same purpose. In August 2014 the commander of the 73rd marine Spetsnaz detachment was killed in an operation near Donetsk, Ukraine. Major Alexei Zinchenko was the first loss for the 73rd marine Spetsnaz detachment as well as the first marine killed in the war in Donbas.

While forces from the Ministry of Interior are often involved in locating spies and saboteurs, the Spetsnaz units of the Ministry of Defense have been more directly involved in the war. Perhaps the most well known are the Spetsnaz units responsible for defending Donetsk International Airport. The Airport was raided on April 18, but maintained operations until May 25, 2014, after which it faced nearly daily attacks. Ukrainian forces have earned the nickname "Cyborgs". Rebels have on multiple occasions stated that they have captured the airport, however the flag of Ukraine has been flying over the dispatch tower, suggesting the airport was actually not captured. The airport's garrison has been able to withstand attacks by Russian T-72 tanks, Grad and Uragan rocket artillery, as well as 2S4 Tyulpan heavy mortars without any air support. By September, Russian Spetsnaz forces began to actively aid the rebels in assaulting the airport, however, they only managed to advance 500 meters closer to the complex by the end of the month.

On 22 November 2014 Spetsnaz groups Cheetah and Titan stormed the Odessa oil refinery. There were no injuries during the operation. A statement from the prosecutor's office of the Odessa Oblast stated that Spetsnaz forces were used to secure the refinery's assets. In April a Ukrainian court ruled that the refinery's assets were to be liquidated, however it was suspected management was trying to profit by illegally selling ₴55 million worth of assets without court approval. Prosecutors attempted to enter the refinery on 17 October 2014 to enforce a court decision to confiscate the refinery's assets but were stopped by security, therefore the decision to use Spetsnaz forces to secure the premises and carry out the previous court order was made by the prosecutor's office.

On 10 August 2016 Russia accused the Special Forces of Ukraine of conducting a raid near the Crimea town of Armyansk which killed 2 Russian servicemen; the government of Ukraine denied any involvement. Ukrainian intelligence services reported that there was indeed a border clash, but stated it was a friendly fire incident between the Russian military and the border service of Russia's Federal Security Service.

Independent formation 

On 5 January 2016, the special forces of Ukraine were placed under a single independent military branch, the Special Operations Forces. The catchphrase of Svyatoslav the Brave, "I Come at You!", was officially adopted as the organization's motto.

In June 2019, the 140th Special Operations Centre was certified as a special ops unit that can be involved in the NATO Response Force, the first from a non-NATO-member state.

As of 1 January 2022, the number of the Special Operations Forces had increased by 1,000.

Following the 2022 Russian invasion of Ukraine, a Special Forces wing made of foreign fighters was initiated by the Ukrainian Defense Ministry's intelligence directorate (GUR). This regiment is separate from the regular international legion but recruits from the force.

Casualties
Overall, the special forces community of Ukraine lost 73 of its members during the war as of 28 October 2017. The breakdown of casualties is as follows:
3rd Special Purpose Regiment – 44 killed in action
8th Special Purpose Regiment – 14 killed in action
73rd Naval Special Purpose Center – 10 killed in action
140th Special Purpose Center – 5 killed in action

Structure 
Special Operations Forces Command  (Military Unit [MU] А0987) - Kyiv

Command and combat support units

 99th Command and Support Battalion (MU А3628) - Berdychiv, Zhytomyr Oblast
 142nd Education and Training Center [uk] - Berdychiv, Zhytomyr Oblast

Land warfare special purpose units 
3rd Special Purpose Regiment 'Prince Sviatoslav the Brave [uk] (MU А0680) - Kropyvnytskyi, Kirovohrad Oblast. (Formed on the basis of the 10th Special Purpose Brigade of the Soviet Armed Forces)
HQ staff
1st Special Purpose Detachment
2nd Special Purpose Detachment
3rd Special Purpose Detachment
Maintenance Unit
Signals Unit
8th Special Purpose Regiment "Iziaslav Mstyslavych" [uk] (MU A0553) - Khmelnytskyi, Khmelnytskyi Oblast. (Formed on the basis of the 8th Special Purpose Brigade of the Soviet Armed Forces)
HQ staff
1st Special Purpose Detachment
2nd Special Purpose Detachment
3rd Special Purpose Detachment
4th Special Purpose Detachment
Maintenance Unit
Signals Unit
140th Special Operations Forces Center [uk] (MU А0661) - Khmelnytskyi, Khmelnytskyi Oblast. (The most elite SOF unit of the Ukrainian Armed Forces. Formerly under the Military Intelligence Directorate of the General Staff, which was reflected with a bat being part of the unit's previous insignia.)Seaborne special purpose units''':

 73rd Maritime Special Operations Center 'Kish otaman Antin Holovaty [uk] (MU A3199) - Pervomaiskyi Island, Ochakiv, Mykolaiv Oblast. (Formed on the basis of the 17th Naval Special Purpose Brigade of the Soviet Navy.)
1st Underwater demolitions Unit
2nd Clearance diver Unit
3rd Reconnaissance Unit
Logistics UnitAviation special purpose units''':

 35th Mixed Aviation Squadron (Havryshivka Air Base (Vinnytsia IAP), Vinnytsia Oblast) - Аn-26, Мі-24, Мі-8, Мі-2 (administratively subordinated to the Air Force's 456th Transport Aviation Brigade)

Commanders
Lieutenant General  (2016–2020)
Major General  (25 August 2020 – 26 July 2022)
Brigadier General  (July 2022 – present)

See also 
 Special forces of Ukraine

References

External links 
 
 «Flaming Sword 2017»: сильні разом!
 Ukrainian SOF
 
 
 
 

2016 establishments in Ukraine
Military units and formations established in 2016
Special forces of Ukraine
Military units and formations of Ukraine